Eiludd Powys was an early 7th-century King of Powys.  

He was likely the son or younger brother of Selyf "Sarffgadau" ap Cynan Garwyn. It is not known which he is as there are two accounts one in Jesus College Ms. 20 that makes him the son of Selyf and brother of Manwgan whereas the Harleian Ms. 3859 makes him the brother of Selyf Sarffgadau. Either is plausible, as it is not unheard of that a brother succeeds in absence of a mature heir (see Rhyddfedd Frych), or that the eldest is passed over in the succession (see Gruffydd ap Llywelyn Fawr and Dafydd ap Llywelyn). There is an interesting reference to the descendants of Selyf, serpents of battle, by the 12th-century Powysian court poet Cynddelw Brydydd Mawr, who, after the dynasty's fall, went to work for Gwynedd and then Powys Wenwynwyn.

References 
www.britannia.com

7th-century births
Monarchs of Powys
House of Gwertherion
7th-century Welsh monarchs
640s deaths